White Lines is a British-Spanish mystery thriller streaming television series created by Álex Pina. The 10-episode first series was released on Netflix on 15 May 2020. In August 2020, the series was cancelled after one season.

Premise
When Zoe Walker's brother Axel is found dead, 20 years after going missing while he was working as a DJ in Ibiza, she decides to travel there and investigate.

Cast and characters

Main
 Laura Haddock as Zoe Walker
 India Fowler as young Zoe
 Nuno Lopes as Duarte "Boxer" Silva
 Rafael Morais as Young Boxer
 Marta Milans as Kika Calafat
 Zoe Mulheims as Young Kika 
 Daniel Mays as Marcus Ward
 Cel Spellman as young Marcus
 Laurence Fox as David
 Jonny Green as young David
 Angela Griffin as Anna Connor
 Kassius Nelson as young Anna
 Juan Diego Botto as Oriol Calafat
 Pedro Casablanc as Andreu Calafat
 Belén López as Conchita Calafat
 Francis Magee as Clint Collins
 Tom Rhys Harries as Axel Collins

Recurring
 Jade Alleyne as Tanny Ward
 Ava Naylor as Matilda Ward
 Barry Ward as Mike Walker
 Fernando Albizu as Pepe Martínez
 Agus Ruiz as Cristobal
 Javi Coll as Juan Miguel Fonseca
 Paulo Pires as George
 Tallulah Evans as Jenny Walker
 Geena Román as Sissy
 Mariano Garmendia as Bruno
 Maggie O'Neill as Yoana

Episodes

Production
It was announced in October 2016 that Netflix had ordered a series created by Money Heist creator Álex Pina. In June 2019, Laura Haddock, Marta Milans, Juan Diego Botto, Nuno Lopes, Daniel Mays, Laurence Fox and Angela Griffin joined the cast of the show.

Filming
Filming commenced in June 2019 in the Balearic Islands and ended in October 2019.

Release
White Lines was released on Netflix on 15 May 2020.

Reception
The review aggregator website Rotten Tomatoes reported a 63% approval rating for the first series with an average rating of 6.57/10, based on 16 reviews. The website's critical consensus reads, "A tasty, self-indulgent tangle of mystery, White Lines is a sight to behold -- even if there's not much below the surface." On Metacritic, it has a weighted average score of 50 out of 100, based on 7 critics, indicating "mixed or average reviews".

References

External links
 
 
 

2020 British television series debuts
2020 British television series endings
2020 Spanish television series debuts
2020 Spanish television series endings
2020s British drama television series
2020s British mystery television series
British thriller television series
English-language Netflix original programming
2020s Spanish drama television series
Spanish-language Netflix original programming
Spanish mystery television series
Television series by Sony Pictures Television
Television series by Left Bank Pictures
Television shows filmed in Spain
Television series by Vancouver Media